Alin Sandu Jivan (born December 2, 1983) is a  Romanian artistic gymnast whose best event is the vault. He is a world and a European medalist on this event.

References

External links

1983 births
Sportspeople from Reșița
Living people
Romanian male artistic gymnasts
Medalists at the World Artistic Gymnastics Championships
21st-century Romanian people